The Qinghe Bridge is a historic stone arch bridge over the Xianqiao River in the town of , Deqing County, Zhejiang, China.

History
Qinghe Bridge was originally built by magistrate Chen Zhifang between 1064 and 1067 during the Northern Song dynasty (960–1279), but because of war and natural disasters has been rebuilt numerous times since then. In March 2005, it has been authorized as a provincial-level cultural heritage site by the Government of Zhejiang.

Gallery

References

Deqing County, Zhejiang
Bridges in Zhejiang
Arch bridges in China
Qing dynasty architecture